The Gigantinho ("Little Giant" in Portuguese) is a sports arena in Porto Alegre, Brazil.

The sixth largest arena in the country, it was opened on 4 November 1973. It is located in the riverside Beira-Rio complex of Sport Club Internacional, next to the "Gigante" ("Giant") stadium. Covering 7,200 square meters, the arena includes an indoor football pitch. The capacity of the gym is 12,864 people for games and 14,586 for concerts. Eleven cabins are set aside for the press. There are thirteen bathrooms (six women, six men and one for the disabled), six changing rooms, and eleven bars. The gym houses the Foundation for Education and Culture of SCI (FECI), where the library is located.

The Gigantinho has hosted numerous events and concerts, as well as the World Social Forum and the World Forum on Education.

Concerts

Many concerts have been held at the arena during recent years, including:

External links
Arena information

Indoor arenas in Brazil
Sports venues in Rio Grande do Sul